John Bittrolff (born July 1, 1966) is an American convicted murderer and a suspect in the Long Island serial killer case. In July 2014, he was charged with the murders of Rita Tangredi and Colleen McNamee. He is also a suspect in the murder of a third woman, Sandra Costilla. Bittrolff became a suspect in the unsolved murders after his brother, Timothy Bittrolff, was partially matched to DNA found on the bodies in 2013. Timothy Bittrolff submitted the sample after violating an unrelated order of protection, in 2013.

On July 5, 2017, Bittrolff was found guilty of the second degree murders of Tangredi and McNamee. He was sentenced to 50 years to life in prison on September 12, 2017. He is imprisoned at Clinton Correctional Facility. His department identification number is 17A3925.

Victims
Bittrolff was convicted of killing two women and is a suspect in the death of a third.

Rita Tangredi
Tangredi was found dead on November 2, 1993 in Suffolk County, New York. Tangredi lived in East Patchogue and was known by police to be a sex worker.

Colleen McNamee
McNamee's body was found on January 30, 1994 in Shirley, New York, also in Suffolk County. Believed by authorities to be a sex worker, she was beaten, strangled to death and left naked in the woods, near the William Floyd Parkway.

Sandra Costilla
Costilla's body was found on November 20, 1993 in North Sea, New York.

Long Island serial killing suspect
After Bittrolff's sentence, the case's prosecutor announced that Bittrolff was also a suspect in at least one of the 10 murders attributed to the unidentified Long Island serial killer  in New York's Suffolk and Nassau counties. Suffolk County District Attorney's office prosecutor Robert Biancavilla released a statement noting that Bittrolff was likely responsible for the deaths of other women, and that, "There are remains of the victims at Gilgo that may be attributed to the handiwork of Mr. Bittrolff, and that investigation is continuing".

Bittrolff was a carpenter who lived in Manorville, where the torsos of Jessica Taylor and Valerie Mack were recovered. The remains were discovered roughly three miles away from Bittrolff's home. He also reportedly once "cut out the heart of a deer he had just shot and ate it raw in the woods." 

A further link between Bittrolff and the Long Island serial killer case has been established: the adult daughter of Bittrolff victim Rita Tangredi was reportedly "best friends" with Melissa Barthelemy, one of the first victims discovered at Gilgo Beach. Barthelemy's mother also reported that Melissa "had a lot of calls to Manorville from her phone" at the time.

See also 
 List of serial killers in the United States

References

1966 births
21st-century American criminals
American male criminals
American people convicted of murder
American prisoners sentenced to life imprisonment
Crimes against sex workers in the United States
Crimes in New York (state)
Living people
Murder in New York (state)
People convicted of murder by New York (state)
Prisoners sentenced to life imprisonment by New York (state)
Suspected serial killers